Constantin Stamati (1786 – 12 September 1869) was a Romanian/Moldovan writer and translator. Born in Romania, he settled in Chişinău, Bessarabia (presently in Moldova) after the 1812 partition of Moldavia at the end of the Russo-Turkish War.

Stamati became a civil servant and official translator under the first Russian administration of the region. He was rewarded by the Russian Emperor with the Medal of Saint Anne and became a knight of that order.

He made the acquaintance of the Russian poet Alexander Pushkin at the time of latter's exile to Chişinău in 1820-1823. Stamati's most important work, Povestea poveştilor ("The Tale of Tales"), an idealized description of Moldavia's beginnings in verse, was published in Iaşi in 1843. His other works include contemporary satires and glorifications of Moldavia's past.

In 1866, he became one of the founding members of the Romanian Academy.

References

Recipients of the Order of St. Anna
Romanian poets
Russian male poets
Romanian male writers
Poets from the Russian Empire
Male writers from the Russian Empire
Romanian translators
Translators from the Russian Empire
Founding members of the Romanian Academy
Writers from Iași
1786 births
1869 deaths